The Battle of Vega Real, also called the Battle of the Holy Hill or the Battle of Jáquimo, took place on 27 March 1495 on the island of Hispaniola between an indigenous alliance and Spanish forces, commanded by Christopher Columbus, Bartholomew Columbus and Alonso de Ojeda, with the help of indigenous people led by Guacanagaríx. The battle resulted in the defeat and capture of the Taíno leader Caonabo, ending indigenous resistance on Hispaniola.

History of Hispaniola